The popularity of the Diablo video game series led to several novels published that are set in Diablos shared universe.

Novels

Demonsbane 

Demonsbane (2000) is an e-novella written by Robert B. Marks. It appears in print in the Diablo Archive (2008).

In the book, Siggard, the only survivor of the battle of Blackmarch, unable to remember the battle's final hours—is driven to avenge those slain by the army of darkness. As he hunts the demonic army, Siggard pieces together the truth of that terrible battle...and finds his nightmare is just beginning.

Demonsbane was a book published in the spirit of the "e-book revolution." However, the market for e-books was quite small at the time and despite months of advertising on battle.net, sales were in the hundreds rather than the projected thousands.

Before being written, it was decided that Demonsbane should set the tone for the series, and help establish Sanctuary not only as a living and breathing game world, but also as a living and breathing world in literature. As such, Marks did a lot of world building using flavour quotes at the beginning of each chapter.

Legacy of Blood 

Legacy of Blood (2001, reissue 2017), the first novel based on Diablo by Blizzard Entertainment. The book was written by Richard A. Knaak.  Legacy of Blood is intended for mature readers. It uses the same image as the cover of the Diablo II game box. It was collected in the Diablo Archive in 2008.

The book is written about a group of three men who stumble upon enchanted armor of unfathomable, immense powers that they have no clue about. The armor ends up belonging to a past warlord named Bartuc, who was the most brutal of all men to walk the earth, painting his armor each morning with the blood from the battle from his deceased foes. He was a Sorcerer who could control demons and used them to his own power to take over cities and countries in order to fiercely reign over the entire earth. He was eventually killed during an enormous battle by multiple people including his own brother Horazon. The armor was hidden away in a dark dungeon protected with dark magical powers where it sat dormant secretly calling to the main character, Norrec. Norrec was among the three tomb raiders when the armor was discovered. The three men were caught in a dire situation causing Norrec to put on the armor and reawaken the power of legions of demons and hell itself. His life would be forever changed...and one would question whether for the better or not.

The Black Road 
The Black Road (2002, reissue 2018) is a novel by Mel Odom. It was collected in the Diablo Archive in 2008.

The Kingdom of Shadow 
The Kingdom of Shadow (2002, reissue 2018) is a novel by Richard A. Knaak. It was collected in the Diablo Archive in 2008.

Moon of the Spider 

Moon of the Spider (2006, reissue 2023) is the third novel set in the Diablo universe written by Richard A. Knaak.

Driven by nightmares to the ruins of a mysterious tomb, Lord Aldric Jitan hopes to awaken a terrible evil that has slept since the fall of Tristram. Drawn by the growing darkness in the land, the enigmatic Necromancer Zayl, stumbles upon Jitan's plot—unaware that one of his own brethren has set these dire events in motion. Now, as the celestial Moon of the Spider rises, the nefarious demon, Astrogha, prepares to unleash his minions upon the world of Sanctuary.

Diablo: The Sin War 

The Sin War is a trilogy of novel series set in Blizzard Entertainment's Diablo universe, written by Richard A. Knaak. It tells the story of Uldyssian as he is drawn into the battle between the Temple of the Triune, run by the Primus under Lucion; the Son of Mephisto and the Cathedral of Light run by the rebel angel Inarius. Uldyssian feels that both sides are corrupt and wants nothing to do with either of them. When he is accused of murdering one of their missionaries, he flees his home town of Seram as he begins to discover his own strange powers. He decides to teach others how to use it, and gathers many followers to him, but the Temple and the Cathedral want his powers for their own and will stop at nothing to get them.

Birthright  (2006, reissue 2019)
Scales of the Serpent  (2007, reissue 2019)
The Veiled Prophet (2007, reissue 2020)

This trilogy was done as a collaboration between Richard and Chris Metzen (Blizzard), so it is considered canon material in the Diablo universe.

Diablo III: The Order 
Diablo III: The Order (2012, paperback 2013, reissue 2021) is a novel by Nate Kenyon.

Diablo III: Heroes Rise, Darkness Falls 
Diablo III: Heroes Rise, Darkness Falls (2012) is an anthology by Micky Neilson, James Waugh, Cameron Dayton, Matt Burns, Michael Chu, and Erik Sabol.

Diablo III: Storm of Light 
Diablo III: Storm of Light (2014) is a novel by Nate Kenyon.

Diablo III: Morbed 
Diablo III: Morbed (2014) is an e-novella by Micky Neilson.

Books and comic books

Diablo: Tales of Sanctuary 
Diablo: Tales of Sanctuary (2001) is a comic book by Francisco Ruiz Velasco, Dave Land, and Phil Amara, published by Dark Horse Comics.

Diablo III: Book of Cain 

Diablo III: Book of Cain (2011, paperback 2016) is a book with text by Flint Dille and art direction by Glenn Rane, Doug Gregory, and Jeremy Cranford. It was the first product based on Diablo III by Blizzard Entertainment.

During the San Diego Comic-Con 2011, Blizzard Entertainment Senior Vice-president of Creative Design Chris Metzen revealed further details about Diablo III: Book of Cain.

Diablo: Sword of Justice 
Diablo: Sword of Justice (2012, reissue 2021) is a comic book series by Aaron Williams and Joseph Lacroix, originally published by DC Comics.

Diablo III: Book of Tyrael 
Diablo III: Book of Tyrael (2013, paperback 2016) is a book by Matt Burns and Doug Alexander.

Book of Adria: A Diablo Bestiary 
Book of Adria: A Diablo Bestiary (2018) is a book by Robert Brooks and Matt Burns.

References 

Diablo (series)
Fantasy novel series
Diablo
Novels based on video games
Works based on Blizzard video games